Michael D. Roberts is an American actor.

Career
Roberts played the role of "Rooster" in the 1970s television series Baretta. Roberts starred in the short-lived 1983 television series Manimal, appearing in five of the eight episodes which aired, as Tyrone C. Earl. His first television role was a guest appearance on the series Good Times in 1974. In 1977, he moved to feature films when he played "Deputy Johnson" in Herowork.

Roberts went on to appear in many other TV shows and films. He appeared in the final Steve McQueen film The Hunter (1980). Later on, he starred in the 1984 science fiction film The Ice Pirates as Roscoe. In 1988, Roberts played the role of Vern in the hit film Rain Man. More recently, he appeared in the 2006 film American Dreamz and the 2008 film Street Kings.

Roberts has made many guest appearances in television shows. In the 1980s TV series Knight Rider, he appeared in the pilot episode "Knight of the Phoenix" as Jackson, one of the two car thieves who end up stealing KITT. His other appearances include Bosom Buddies, Quantum Leap, The Incredible Hulk, Double Trouble, Friends, MacGyver, and Seinfeld. Roberts has made appearances in several made-for-TV films.

Personal life
On September 18, 1976, Roberts married actress Pamela Frey, whom he met in an acting class taught by Lillian Randolph. The couple have two children together. Roberts is a Scientologist.

Filmography

Films

Television

References

External links
 

Living people
Place of birth missing (living people)
American male film actors
African-American male actors
American male television actors
American Scientologists
21st-century African-American people
20th-century African-American people
Year of birth missing (living people)